Bettina "Tina" Evers (born August 17, 1981 in Hannover, West Germany) is a German ice hockey forward.

International career
Evers was selected for the Germany women's national ice hockey team in the 2002, 2006 and 2014 Winter Olympics. In 2002, she did not have a point. In 2006, she again failed to record a point. In 2014, she had one assist in five games.

Evers also played for Germany in the qualifying event for the 2010 Winter Olympics and the 2006 qualifying.

As of 2014, Evers has also appeared for Germany at eleven IIHF Women's World Championships. Her first appearance came in 1999.

Career statistics

International career
Through 2013-14 season

References

External links
 
 
 
 

1981 births
Living people
Ice hockey players at the 2002 Winter Olympics
Ice hockey players at the 2006 Winter Olympics
Ice hockey players at the 2014 Winter Olympics
Olympic ice hockey players of Germany
Sportspeople from Hanover
German women's ice hockey forwards